Wurmbea densiflora is a species of plant in the Colchicaceae family that is endemic to Australia.

Description
The species is a cormous perennial herb that grows to a height of 7–20 cm. Its pink flowers appear from May to September.

Distribution and habitat
The species is found in the Avon Wheatbelt, Coolgardie, Geraldton Sandplains, Great Victoria Desert, Murchison and Yalgoo IBRA bioregions of western Western Australia. It grows in red loam, clay and sandy clay soils.

References

densiflora
Monocots of Australia
Flora of Western Australia
Plants described in 1878
Taxa named by George Bentham
Taxa named by Terry Desmond Macfarlane